The men's 400 metre individual medley event at the 1972 Summer Olympics took place August 30.  This swimming event used medley swimming. Because an Olympic size swimming pool is 50 metres long, this race consisted of eight lengths of the pool. The first two lengths were swum using the butterfly stroke, the second pair with the backstroke, the third pair of lengths in breaststroke, and the final two were freestyle.  Unlike other events using freestyle, swimmers could not use butterfly, backstroke, or breaststroke for the freestyle leg; most swimmers use the front crawl in freestyle events.

Final with controversial margin
The final was won by Gunnar Larsson, who succeeded over second-placed Tim McKee by two thousandths of a second. This margin in effect brought about a change in the competition, so that no swimming competition henceforward would have to be decided by a margin less than a hundredth of a second.

Medalists

Results

Heats
Heat 1

Heat 2

Heat 3

Heat 4

Heat 5

Final

Key: OR = Olympic record

References

Men's Individual Medley 400 metre
Men's events at the 1972 Summer Olympics